Put-Put Troubles is a 1940 American Donald Duck short film directed by Riley Thomson and produced by Walt Disney.

Plot
Donald is in his motorboat with Pluto towing it. Pluto gets distracted by a frog, and loses control of the boat. Donald then struggles with the outboard motor causing chaos to rein.

Voice cast
 Clarence Nash as Donald Duck
 Lee Millar as Pluto

Home media
The short was released on May 18, 2004, on Walt Disney Treasures: The Chronological Donald, Volume One: 1934-1941.

References

External links 
 

Donald Duck short films
Films produced by Walt Disney
1940s Disney animated short films
1940 animated films
1940 films